The 2022 Men's Beach Handball World Championships was the ninth edition of the championship, held from 21 to 26 June 2022 at Crete, Greece under the aegis of International Handball Federation (IHF). It was the first time in history that the championship is organised by Hellenic Handball Federation.

Croatia won their third title after defeating Denmark in the final.

Qualification

Russia was excluded due to the 2022 Russian invasion of Ukraine.

Draw
The draw took place on 13 May 2022.

Preliminary round
All times are local (UTC+3).

Group A

Group B

Group C

Group D

Consolation round

Main round
Points obtained against teams from the same group were carried over.

Group I

Group II

Knockout stage

Bracket
Championship bracket

Fifth place bracket

9–16th place bracket

13–16th place bracket

9–16th place quarterfinals

Quarterfinals

13–16th place semifinals

9–12th place semifinals

5–8th place semifinals

Semifinals

15th place game

13th place game

Eleventh place game

Ninth place game

Seventh place game

Fifth place game

Third place game

Final

Final ranking

Statistics and awards

Top goalscorers

Top goalkeepers

Awards
The awards were announced on 26 June 2022.

References

External links
IHF website

Beach World Championships
Beach Handball World Championships
Beach Handball World Championships
Beach Handball World Championships
Sport in Heraklion
Beach Handball
Sports events affected by the 2022 Russian invasion of Ukraine